Bourgogne des Flandres is a Belgian beer brewed by Timmermans Brewery in Itterbeek in the municipality of Dilbeek which is located in Flemish Brabant.

History 
Bourgogne des Flandres has existed since 1911. It was then brewed by Van Houtryve Family. In 1957, it was produced by the Verhaeghe Brewery which would produce later on the Duchesse de Bourgogne. Since the early 1990s, Bourgogne des Flandres has been brewed by the Timmermans Brewery which is a part of John Martin Brewery group.

Beers 
 Bourgogne des Flandres Brune is a special type of brown beer formed by mixed fermentation combining a selection of mixed lambic (spontaneous fermentation) and a brown beer of high fermentation and aged in oak barrels. In 2009, it was awarded with 3 stars by Superior Taste Award of the International Taste & Quality Institute, and in 2012 it won the bronze medal at the Brussels Beer Challenge in the category of Red Ale: Old Red (Flanders Red Ale)
 Bourgogne des Flandres Blonde  is a light ale beer which is formed with high fermentation and it has strong bitterness, measuring 6% alcohol by volume.

References

External links
 Bourgogne des Flandres Brune/Bruin
  - Bourgogne des Flandres – Belgian Beer on BeerTourism.com
 Bourgogne des Flandres

Belgian beer brands